Oleg Molla (born 22 February 1986, Chișinău, Moldavian SSR) is a Moldavian football striker.

Club statistics
Total matches played in Moldavian First League: 123 matches – 28 goals

References

External links

Profile at Divizia Nationala
Profile at FC Dacia Chișinău

1986 births
Footballers from Chișinău
Moldovan footballers
Living people
Association football forwards
FC Iskra-Stal players
FC Dacia Chișinău players
FC Sfîntul Gheorghe players
FC Zimbru Chișinău players
FC Tiraspol players
FC Saxan players
FC Spicul Chișcăreni players
Moldovan Super Liga players